The Libu Party (Berber language: Akabar en Libu, ⴰⴾⴰⴱⴰⵔ ⴻⵏ ⵍⵉⴱⵓ, Arabic: حزب ليبو) also known as Libya The Nation Party, is a Libyan political party founded in 2017 by the former World Amazigh Congress president Fathi Ben Khalifa. The main headquarters of the party is in the coastal city of Zuwara with other branches in Tripoli, Ubari and other cities. 

According to its founder, the party is aimed at establishing a democratic Libyan state. The party defends on the Amazigh (Berber) Libyan identity instead of Arabism. The party also calls for the recognition of the Berber language (Tamazight) as an official language of the State of Libya.

The Party president also said he is "not sure" whether the party would participate or not in the elections proposed by the UN to be held in 2018.

References

2017 establishments in Libya
Berberist political parties
Berbers in Libya
Liberal parties in Libya
Libyan nationalism
Political parties established in 2017
Political parties in Libya